Elmin Rastoder (born 7 October 2001) is a Swiss professional footballer who plays as a forward for Liechtenstein club FC Vaduz in the Swiss Challenge League, on loan from Swiss Super League side Grasshopper.

Professional career
Rastoder joined Grasshopper Club Zürich's academy in 2017 and has been a part of their various youth squads. In the 2021-22 1. Liga season, he scored 13 goals in 26 games for the Grasshopper U21 squad.

He made his professional debut for the first team of Grasshopper on 16 October 2020 against Xamax in the Swiss Challenge League. His top flight debut in the Swiss Super League occurred on 20 March 2022 against FC Basel, when he was subbed on for the last ten minutes of the game. He extended his contract with Grasshopper on 7 April 2022, keeping him at the club until 2024. To further develop his skills and earn more play time, he was loaned to FC Vaduz in the Swiss Challenge League for the 2022-23 season.

Career statistics

Club

References

External links
 
 SFL Profile

2001 births
Living people
People from Wetzikon
Swiss men's footballers
Grasshopper Club Zürich players
Swiss Challenge League players
Association football forwards